John Carr Bell (13 January 1904 – 1950) was an English professional footballer who played as a goalkeeper for Sunderland.

References

1904 births
1950 deaths
Sportspeople from Seaham
English footballers
Association football goalkeepers
Sunderland A.F.C. players
Walsall F.C. players
Accrington Stanley F.C. players
Bradford (Park Avenue) A.F.C. players
English Football League players
Footballers from County Durham